Muthapudupet is a locality in Avadi which is a neighbourhood in Chennai comes under the Avadi Municipal Corporation limit and Chennai Metropolitan area. Muthapudupet is around 8 km from Avadi and 29 km from Chennai. The Chennai Outer Ring Road (ORR) passes through Muthapudupet and nearby areas like Pattabiram and Mittanamalle

Areas around the 
Muthapudupet were once paddy fields, fruit farms, lakes, swamps. Now the field areas have shrunk and residential plots have sprung up. The soil is sandy and instantial laterite, mostly Recent Alluvium. Geological formations are concealed by Recent alluvium, with little or no exposure of rocks, most formations being Archean and tertiary sediments.

Muthapudupet is a predominantly Tamil speaking area with sizable Telugu speakers. Most people here are Multilingual, Speaking Tamil, Mothertongue and Hindi/English. One can find people from every region of India in Muthapudupet-Mittanamallee. Thanks to nearby Defence/Central Government Establishments. Central Government is the largest employer in Muthapudupet.

New IT parks
A new Tidel park (IT Park) with approx 50 IT companies under construction in Avadi- Pattabiram near Muthapudupet in MTH road. IT professionals residing in the nearby areas will get job opportunity and reduce the time of travelling to IT corridor in South Chennai. The land value of Muthapudupet, Palavedu, Pattabiram, Avadi and some nearby areas will reach the peak due to the establishment of this tech park. The first of phase of the project will login by 2023

Transport 

Railways
Muthapudupet is served by Pattabiram Military Siding 'E' Depot Sub-urban Railway station. This station has one platform and accommodates a 9-car rake and 12- car rake is the terminus of EMU 'Siding' or 'S' and PRES OR PTMS Train. Regular Train service start at 0320 hrs in the morning and Last train is at 2120 hrs. There are trains towards Chennai Beach railway station at 0820 hrs, 1720 hrs and 2030hrs. Trains from Chennai Central to Military Siding begins at 0415 hrs and ends at 2230 hrs. Trains ply at hourly bases.

Roadways
Metropolitan Transport Corporation (Chennai) (MTC) buses ply frequently between Avadi and Muthapudupet. 
Apart from buses, auto's are available on ready bases. Except during odd hours, Uber/ Ola cabs do ply as well.

Facilities 

There is one Multi Specialty Clinic (Srimi Clinic) two general clinics, six medical shops and a lab in Muthapudupet. There is a Station Sick Quarters at the Air Force Station, which caters only Air Force Personnel. Nearby hospitals are Grace Hospital, Pattabiram Avadi Govt General Hospital, Sir Ivan Stedeford Hospital ( towards Ambattur). There is a military hospital  towards Avadi for defence personnel.

T8 Muthapudupet Police Station falls under the Avadi range and was situated back of Ayyappan Temple, Muthapudupet. Now they have shifted to Palavedu near ORR highway road.

Main roads are maintained by Avadi Municipal Corporation, Air Force, CRPF and HVF.

Highways
Six lane Outer Ring Road (Chennai ORR) Connecting Minjur with Vandaloor, bypassing Chennai and suburbs passes tangentially at Muthapudupet.

Other info

Electricity is provided by Tamil Nadu Electricity Board via 11 kV feeders from Pattabiram SS (urban) and Thirunindravur SS (rural). High voltage distribution is to be erected.

Wired landline services are provided by BSNL. Muthapudupet comes under Brindavan Nagar Exchange, 044 2684 1000. A typical landline number is 044 2684 xxxx. All major telecom companies have towers in Muthapudupet.

Metro water and sewage systems had yet to be commissioned as of 2016.

Education 

Avadi Municipality Middle School, Muthapudupet.

Kindergarten, Butterfly School, St. Mary's School, Air Force Kindergarten, Carmel

Mitnamallee LP and UP school, Palavedu LP school

State board-Private, Butterfly school, St. Mary's School, Vijayantha Schools at avadi, Chennai.

CBSE schools, Kendriya Vidyalaya Air Force Station, Air Force School.
There are four other Kendriya Vidyalayas in Avadi also cater Muthapudupet.

College:
Aalim Muhammed Salegh College Of Engineering, Aalim Muhammed Salegh Polytechnic College.,
Aalim Muhammed Salegh Academy of Architecture

References

Villages in Tiruvallur district